The 2003 Kremlin Cup was a tennis tournament played on indoor carpet courts at the Olympic Stadium in Moscow in Russia that was part of the International Series of the 2003 ATP Tour and of Tier I of the 2003 WTA Tour. The tournament ran from 29 September through 5 October 2003.

Finals

Men's singles

 Taylor Dent defeated  Sargis Sargsian 7–6(7–5), 6–4
 It was Dent's 3rd title of the year and the 4th of his career.

Women's singles

 Anastasia Myskina defeated  Amélie Mauresmo 6–2, 6–4
 It was Myskina's 4th title of the year and the 6th of her career.

Men's doubles

 Mahesh Bhupathi /  Max Mirnyi defeated  Wayne Black /  Kevin Ullyett 6–3, 7–5
 It was Bhupathi's 4th title of the year and the 30th of his career. It was Mirnyi's 5th title of the year and the 18th of his career.

Women's doubles

 Nadia Petrova /  Meghann Shaughnessy defeated  Anastasia Myskina /  Vera Zvonareva 6–3, 6–4
 It was Petrova's only title of the year and the 4th of her career. It was Shaughnessy's 1st title of the year and the 4th of her career.

External links
 Official website 
 Official website 
 ATP Tournament Profile
 WTA Tournament Profile

Kremlin Cup
Kremlin Cup
Kremlin Cup
Kremlin Cup
Kremlin Cup
Kremlin Cup
Kremlin Cup